Dirk Verbeuren (born 8 January 1975) is a Belgian musician and the current drummer of American thrash metal band Megadeth, amongst other projects. He previously was a member of the Swedish melodic death metal band Soilwork.

Verbeuren recorded five full-length albums and a live DVD/Blu-ray with Soilwork, and performed in Europe, the United States, Canada, Japan, Australia, Russia and China as a headlining act between early 2004 and July 2016. In 2016, Verbeuren left Soilwork to join Megadeth as a full-time member. With Megadeth, Verbeuren has since recorded the full-length album The Sick, the Dying... and the Dead!, released in September 2022.

Influences 
Verbeuren cites Dave Lombardo and Mick Harris as earliest influences on his drumming. Other influences include Gavin Harrison, Sean Reinert, Gene Hoglan, Tomas Haake, Steve Flynn, Pete Sandoval, Morgan Ågren, Tony Laureano and Chad Smith. Verbeuren is also a fan of hip hop music and mentioned The Beastie Boys, Run-DMC, and Public Enemy as his favourite hip hop groups in the teen years.

Equipment 

Verbeuren is endorsed by Tama drums and sticks, Meinl cymbals, Evans Drumheads, Toontrack software, dB drumshoes and Alien Ears in-ear monitors. He recorded four elaborate MIDI drum packs for Toontrack: Library of the Extreme: Blasts and Fills, Death & Thrash, Fill Insanity and Metal Beats and contributed MIDI tracks to The Metal Foundry SDX and Metal! EZX.

Session work 

As I Destruct
Brave the Cold
Colosso
Jeff Loomis
Malevolence
Naglfar
The Devin Townsend Project
Eths, session drummer on Ankaa (2016)
Warrel Dane
Satyricon (live session drums, January 2014)
Sybreed
Darkride
Hassan Iqbal
Yyrkoon
Articulus

Personal life 
Verbeuren is a vegan.

References

External links 

 Dirk Verbeuren's official website
 Megadeth's official website
 Bent Sea's official website
 Soilwork's official website

1975 births
Living people
Musicians from Antwerp
People from Wilrijk
Belgian drummers
Heavy metal drummers
Cadaver (band) members
Megadeth members
21st-century drummers
Soilwork members
Belgian heavy metal musicians